Bedellia oplismeniella is a moth of the family Bedelliidae. It was first described by Otto Swezey in 1912. It is endemic to the Hawaiian Islands, specifically to Oahu and possibly Molokai and Hawaii.

The larvae feed on Oplismenus compositus and Panicum torridum. They mine the leaves of their host plant. The mine is usually positioned lengthwise in the leaf, widening as the larvae grows in size. Full-grown larvae are about 5 mm long and pale green with a mid-dorsal purplish-red stripe. When full grown, the larva emerges from the leaf, spins a few fibers beside the mid-rib of the leaf, at the base, or in some other partially secluded place, then pupates among these fibers without making a cocoon. The pupa is about 4 mm long and pale yellowish. The pupal period lasts about 8 days.

External links

Bedelliidae
Endemic moths of Hawaii